Young Munster is a rugby union club based in Limerick, Ireland, playing in Division 1A of the All-Ireland League. It was founded in 1895 and plays its games at Tom Clifford Park in Rosbrien, Limerick.

Club honours have included nine wins in the Munster Senior Rugby Cup, in 1928, 1930, 1938, 1980, 1984, 1990, 2010, completing the double 2021,2022 and eight triumphs in the Munster Junior Cup in 1911, 1922, 1927, 1959, 1960, 1984 and 1999,2022

The club is known by its nickname "The Cookies".

History
Founded in 1895, Young Munster was the first Limerick rugby club to have won the Bateman Cup, which they won in 1928. The club song, Beautiful Munsters, remembers this victory. They also won the All Ireland League in 1993 by beating St Mary's College at Lansdowne Road in front of a record attendance for a club game of 20,000.

In 1985, the club also was one of the first Irish teams to tour North America, when they played five games in New York City, Vancouver, Langley (B.C.), Los Angeles and San Diego.

After a decade in the All-Ireland League Division 1, the club was relegated to Division 2 in 2002. The club played in Division 2 of the All-Ireland League in the 2007-2008 year, but as a result of winning promotion, it will play in Division 1 in 2008-2009. It maintained division 1 status with victory on the last day of the 2008-2009 season away to UCD. Due to the new format of the All-Ireland League, Young Munster played in Division 1B in the 2009-2010 season and won promotion to Division 1A by finishing in second place behind Old Belvedere RFC. Young Munster finished the 2010-2011 regular season in third place in Division 1A, thereby earning a place in the All-Ireland League semi-finals, away to Cork Constitution F.C.

Honours
 All-Ireland League (1): 1992-93
 All-Ireland Cup (1): 1927-28
 Munster Senior Cup (10): 1927-28, 1929-30, 1937-38, 1979-80, 1983-84, 1989-90, 2009-10, 2020-21, 2021-22, 2022-23
 Munster Senior League (5): 1929-30, 1931-32, 1943-44, 1951-52, 1995-96
 Munster Junior Cup (9): 1911, 1922, 1927, 1959, 1960, 1984, 1999, 2016, 2022

Notable players
 Tom Clifford
 Peter Clohessy
 Mike Mullins
 Rob Henderson
 Paul O'Connell

References

External links
 Young Munster RFC's Official Website
 Limerick Rugby Website

 
Rugby clubs established in 1895
Irish rugby union teams
Rugby union clubs in County Limerick
Rugby union clubs in Limerick (city)
Senior Irish rugby clubs (Munster)
1895 establishments in Ireland